Olbramovice is a market town in Znojmo District in the South Moravian Region of the Czech Republic. It has about 1,100 inhabitants.

Notable people
Erhard Raus (1889–1956), German general

References

Populated places in Znojmo District
Market towns in the Czech Republic